Jonathan Krisel (born January 4, 1979) is an American director, producer, writer, editor, and occasional actor. He is best known for co-creating the series  Portlandia (for which he also directed and co-wrote in the majority of episodes), and he is also known for the 2016 FX series Baskets. Krisel has collaborated with the comedy duo Tim & Eric, beginning with Tom Goes to the Mayor and later directed most of the episodes of both Tim and Eric Awesome Show, Great Job! and Check It Out! with Dr. Steve Brule. He has executive produced several other TV series, including Kroll Show, Man Seeking Woman, and most recently the Showtime series Moonbase 8. He executive produced the Fox pilot Ghosted and has also collaborated with The Lonely Island on several SNL Digital Shorts.

Career 
Jonathan Krisel first began working with the comedy duo Tim & Eric in 2006 on their animated series Tom Goes to the Mayor, where he worked as an animator, producer, and senior editor. Next, he worked as director, writer, co-executive producer, and senior editor on their sketch comedy series Tim and Eric Awesome Show, Great Job! from 2007 to 2010. Further, he directed episodes of Check It Out! with Dr. Steve Brule and contributed to the script of the 2012 film Tim and Eric's Billion Dollar Movie. He also worked as a producer and creative collaborator on several Digital Shorts for the sketch comedy television series Saturday Night Live.

Since 2011, he has co-created, written, and executive produced every episode of and directed 52 episodes (including the first 44) of the satirical sketch comedy series Portlandia, starring Carrie Brownstein and Fred Armisen on IFC network. Furthermore, Krisel co-created the show and appeared in three episodes. He has also directed episodes of Kroll Show, Man Seeking Woman, and the Showtime series Moonbase 8.

He is the co-creator of the comedy series Baskets, alongside comedians Louis C.K. and Zach Galifianakis, with the latter starring in the project. Krisel is also the program's executive producer and primary director. The show premiered on FX on January 21, 2016.

He is also the grandson of child actress Virginia Weidler.

On September 30, 2018, Krisel was announced to write and direct an upcoming Sesame Street movie.

On March 3, 2023, Krisel was announced to direct the sequel to Detective Pikachu.

Filmography

Film

Television

References

American comedy writers
American television directors
American television producers
Place of birth missing (living people)
American television writers
American male television writers
American television editors
Living people
1979 births
21st-century American screenwriters
21st-century American male writers